Shafir is a moshav in southern Israel. Located in the Shephelah near Kiryat Malakhi, it falls under the jurisdiction of Shafir Regional Council.

History
Shafir was founded on 15 August 1949 by immigrants from Hungary and Czechoslovakia and was built on land that had belonged to the Palestinian village of al-Sawafir al-Sharqiyya, which had been depopulated during the 1948 Arab–Israeli War. It was named after the Biblical city of Shafir that is mentioned in the Book of Micah 1:11, which also means "good and beautiful". Today Shafir is made up of a mixture of Czechoslovakian/ Hungarians, and Persians.

References

Moshavim
Populated places established in 1949
Populated places in Southern District (Israel)
1949 establishments in Israel
Czech-Jewish culture in Israel
Hungarian-Jewish culture in Israel
Slovak-Jewish culture in Israel